

References

Additional sources

 
 

I